Voria ruralis is a species of fly in the family Tachinidae.

Distribution
Albania, Andorra, Austria, Belarus, Belgium, Bosnia and Herzegovina, Bulgaria, Croatia, Czech Republic, Denmark, Estonia, Finland, France, Germany, Greece, Hungary, Italy, Ireland, Latvia, Madeira, Moldova, Netherlands, North Macedonia, Norway, Poland, Romania, Russia, Slovakia, Slovenia, Spain, Sweden, Switzerland, Ukraine, U.K.

References

Dexiinae
Diptera of Europe
Diptera of Asia
Diptera of North America
Diptera of South America
Diptera of Australasia
Insects described in 1810
Taxa named by Carl Fredrik Fallén